Christian O'Sullivan (born 22 August 1991) is a Norwegian handball player, and team captain for both SC Magdeburg and the Norwegian national team.

He participated at the 2019 World Men's Handball Championship.

Career 
O'Sullivan began his career in the Norwegian club Bækkelagets SK. In 2014, he moved to the Swedish club Kristianstad, where he won twice the Swedish Championship. In 2016, O'Sullivan moved to German club SC Magdeburg.

References

External links
 
 
 Christian O'Sullivan at the Norwegian Handball Federation 
 
 

1991 births
Living people
Handball players from Oslo
Norwegian people of British descent
Norwegian people of Irish descent
Norwegian male handball players
Expatriate handball players
IFK Kristianstad players
Handball-Bundesliga players
SC Magdeburg players
Norwegian expatriate sportspeople in Germany
Norwegian expatriate sportspeople in Sweden
Handball players at the 2020 Summer Olympics
Olympic handball players of Norway